Dagmar Vermeulen is a former Dutch female professional squash player. She achieved her highest PSA world ranking of 70 in September 2007. She was part of the Dutch squad which competed at the 2008 Women's World Team Squash Championships.

References

External links 
 

Living people
Dutch female squash players
Year of birth missing (living people)